Operation Dismantle v R [1985] 1 S.C.R. 441 is a decision by the Supreme Court of Canada where the court rejected a section 7 Charter challenge against the government for allowing the US government to test cruise missiles over Canadian territory.

It was argued that the use of cruise missiles by the US government increased the risk of nuclear war and that Canada's participation made Canada a more likely target.

Chief Justice Brian Dickson, writing for the majority, struck down the claim on the basis that given the unpredictability of foreign policy decisions of sovereign nations, suggestion of an increase in danger can only be speculative. It would be impossible to prove a causal link between the testing and the increased threat.

In her reasons, Wilson J. dismissed the use of the political question in Canadian law. She examined the jurisprudence behind the doctrine identified its basis in the core US constitutional principle of the separation of powers. She distinguished this from Canadian constitutional law where separation is not a core principle, but rather is only secondary. Instead, there is a foundation in overlap between the branches as demonstrated in the system of responsible government. Wilson concludes that section 24 of the Charter requires judicial review of the executive branch of the government. For an issue to be justiciable the question must raise a legal issue. She further noted that exercise of the royal prerogative can be judicially reviewed under section 32 of the Charter.

External links
 

Section Seven Charter case law
Supreme Court of Canada cases
1985 in Canadian case law
1985 in the environment
1985 in international relations